I Took Up the Runes is an album by Norwegian saxophonist Jan Garbarek released on the ECM label and performed by Garbarek, Rainer Brüninghaus, Eberhard Weber, Nana Vasconcelos, Manu Katché, and Bugge Wesseltoft with Ingor Ánte Áilo Gaup contributing vocals.

Reception
In a contemporaneous review, Jim Aikin described the album as a "hauntingly evocative Euro-jazz session" and identified the "Gula Gula" track as "especially memorable".

The Allmusic review by Mark W. B. Allender awards the album 3½ stars and states "A more eclectic release than his preceding releases, Jan Garbarek's I Took Up the Runes satisfies listeners who had been more or less impatient for something with some meat and some muscle... A sign of good things to come".

Track listing
All compositions by Jan Garbarek except where noted.
 "Gula Gula" (Mari Boine) – 5:55  
 "Molde Canticle: Part 1" – 5:13  
 "Molde Canticle: Part 2" – 5:43  
 "Molde Canticle: Part 3" – 9:54  
 "Molde Canticle: Part 4" – 5:10  
 "Molde Canticle: part 5" – 6:06  
 "His Eyes Were Suns" (Traditional) – 6:04  
 "I Took up the Runes" – 5:24  
 "Buena Hora, Buenos Vientos" – 8:51  
 "Rahkki Sruvvis" (Ingor Ánte Áilo Gaup) – 2:26

Personnel
Jan Garbarek – tenor saxophone, soprano saxophone
Rainer Brüninghaus – piano
Eberhard Weber – bass
Nana Vasconcelos – percussion
Manu Katché – drums
Bugge Wesseltoft – synthesizer
Ingor Ánte Áilo Gaup – voice

References

Jan Garbarek albums
1990 albums
ECM Records albums